The Harrison Public School District is a comprehensive public school district serving students in pre-kindergarten through twelfth grade, located in the municipality of Harrison, in Hudson County, New Jersey, United States. The district is one of 31 former Abbott districts statewide that were established pursuant to the decision by the New Jersey Supreme Court in Abbott v. Burke which are now referred to as "SDA Districts" based on the requirement for the state to cover all costs for school building and renovation projects in these districts under the supervision of the New Jersey Schools Development Authority.
As of the 2018–19 school year, the district, comprised of four schools, had an enrollment of 2,409 students and 166.5 classroom teachers (on an FTE basis), for a student–teacher ratio of 14.5:1.

The district is classified by the New Jersey Department of Education as being in District Factor Group "B", the second lowest of eight groupings. District Factor Groups organize districts statewide to allow comparison by common socioeconomic characteristics of the local districts. From lowest socioeconomic status to highest, the categories are A, B, CD, DE, FG, GH, I and J.

Students from the neighboring borough of East Newark attend the district's high school as part of a sending/receiving relationship with the East Newark School District.

Schools
Schools in the district (with 2019 - 20 enrollment data from the National Center for Education Statistics) are:
Harrison Early Childhood Program (grades Pre-K3 and PreK4)
Kennedy Elementary School  (grades Pre-K - 1)
JoAnn Botch, Principal
Steven Valente, Assistant Principal
Lincoln Elementary School with 562 students in grades 2-3
Amy M. Heberling, Principal
Hamilton Intermediate School with 307 students in grades 4-5
Kevin Stahl, Principal 
Middle school
Washington Middle School with 417 students in grades 6-8
Michael Landy, Principal
Kevin Barber, Assistant Principal
High school
Harrison High School with 692 students in grades 9-12
Matthew D. Weber, Principal
Kimberly Huaranga, Assistant Principal
Steve Lipski, Assistant Principal

New schools and grade realignment 
The construction of a new structure to house Harrison High School began in January, 2005, and was completed in the summer of 2007 in time for the 2007-2008 school year.  The new Harrison High School is located at the intersection of Kingsland Avenue and Hamilton Street in the northeastern corner of the town on the former site of Clayton Container.  A new stadium was constructed along with the school building.  The campus includes a football/soccer field, baseball diamond, softball diamond, running track around the fields, and 3 tennis courts.  The building includes thirty general education classrooms, four special education classrooms, two classrooms for small group instruction, two gymnasiums, a dance/aerobics studio, instrumental/vocal music room, cafeteria, auditorium, media center, science labs, computer room, and faculty spaces.

Although Washington Middle School has been relocated to the former site of the high school, the planned remodeling of the old high school has been put on hold indefinitely due to funding issues involving the New Jersey Schools Construction Corporation and mismanagement of funds.

In September 2007, Harrison realigned the grades being housed in each of the school buildings in town. The new Harrison High School located on Hamilton Street between Kingsland and Schuyler Avenues opened to students in grades 9–12. As a result, the old Harrison High School building, located on 1 North 5th Street, was renamed as Washington Middle School. The old Washington Middle School, in turn, located on Hamilton Street between North 2nd and North 3rd Streets, has been renamed Hamilton School and now houses the 4th and 5th grades that formerly used the top floors of Holy Cross School. Holy Cross School has since been vacated by the Harrison Public School district.

Choice program
The Harrison Public School District participates in the Interdistrict Public School Choice Program. For the 2005–06. school year parents can request to transfer a child from the Washington School, designated by the State of New Jersey as a Category I School, to another school which is not a Category I School. Since there is only one elementary school in Harrison, parents can request a transfer to the Hoboken Public Schools under the Choice program. A transfer request will depend upon the capacity of the selected Hoboken school.

Administration
Core members of the district's administration are:
Maureen Kroog, Acting Superintendent
Daniel Choffo, Business Administrator / Board Secretary

Board of education
The district's board of education is comprised of nine members, who set policy and oversee the fiscal and educational operation of the district through its administration. As a Type I school district, the board's trustees are appointed by the Mayor to serve three-year terms of office on a staggered basis, with three members up for reappointment each year. Of the more than 600 school districts statewide, Harrison is one of 15 districts with appointed school boards. The board appoints a superintendent to oversee the district's day-to-day operations and a business administrator to supervise the business functions of the district.

References

External links 

School Data for the Harrison Public School District, National Center for Education Statistics

Harrison, New Jersey
New Jersey Abbott Districts
New Jersey District Factor Group B
School districts in Hudson County, New Jersey